Corazón Guerrero (Warrior Heart) is the third studio album by Willie Colón, originally released on May 9, 1982. And later released in August 1982, by Fania Records. It is often considered the first Latin pop album due to the mix of harmonic rhythms that Colón used in the recordings with the violins and the saxophones. The song that most highlights this is "Casanova" which contains characteristics of modern Latin pop. On this album, Willie Colón does not skimp on excellent musicians, especially on trombone, percussion and voice.

The result is a neo-solo musical extravaganza that truly captures the musical energy of the innovator of the time. One of the best songs on the album is the ballad "El Hijo Y El Papá."

Album synopsis 
The album was made in full musical creativity of Colón where his single Corazón Guerrero was fundamental, and Casanova, there is also the ballad "El Hijo Y El Papa" which was dedicated to his son Diego.

Tracklisting 
The track listing has been adapted from AllMusic releases of the Corazón Guerrero album.

Musicians and Staff 
Recording Musicians.
 Jack Adelman: Editing
 John Andrews: Drums
 Gabriela Arnon: Choir, Chorus, Vocals (Background)
 Sam Burtis: Trombone (Bass)
 Jorge Calandrelli: Piano
 Milton Cardona: Conga
 Graciela Carriqui: Assistant Producer, Audio Production, Choir, Chorus, Vocals (Background)
 Diego Colón: Children's Voices, Vocals, Vocals (Background)
 Willie Colón: Adaptation, Audio Production, Concept, Director, Musical Direction, Producer, Translation, Trombone, Vocals
 Sal Cuevas: Assistant Producer, Audio Production, Bass, Guitar (Bass)
 Cecilia Engelhart: Vocals (Background)
 Doris Eugenio: Choir, Chorus, Vocals (Background)
 Jon Fausty: Audio Engineer, Engineer, Technical Director
 Blanca Goodfriend: Vocals (Background)
 Louise Hilton: Graphic Design
 Lewis Kahn: Trombone
 Harold Kohon: Strings
 Leo Pineda: Audio Production
 Jose Mangual: Bongos
 Leopoldo Pineda: Assistant Producer, Trombone
 John Purcell: Flute, Saxophone
 Dan Reagan: Trombone
 Deborah Resto: Choir, Chorus, Vocals (Background)
 Elliot Sachs: Art Direction
 Ulf Skogsbergh: Photography
 Mauricio Smith: Flute, Saxophone
 Jose Torres: Piano
 Buddy Williams: Drums
 Kevin Zambrana: Assistant Engineer
 Héctor "Bomberito" Zarzuela: Flugelhorn.

References

Fania Records albums
Willie Colón albums
1982 albums
Salsa albums
Latin pop albums by American artists